Crack-Up is the third studio album by American band Fleet Foxes, released on June 16, 2017, by Nonesuch Records. It is the follow-up to their 2011 album Helplessness Blues, following the band's three-year hiatus from 2013 to 2016. It is also the band's first release on the Nonesuch label since departing Sub Pop.

Recording 
Crack-Up was recorded at various locations across the United States between July 2016 and January 2017: Electric Lady Studios, Sear Sound, The Void, Rare Book Room, Avast Recording Company, and The Unknown. Phil Ek mixed the album at Sear Sound, and Greg Calbi mastered it at Sterling Sound.

Release 
Fleet Foxes released the first song from the album on March 7, 2017: "Third of May / Ōdaigahara", a "nearly nine-minute epic powered by piano and electric twelve-string guitar, string quartet, and the group's trademark sparkling harmonies"; on the same day, Robin Pecknold appeared on Apple Music's Beats 1 radio station to discuss the new song, as well as the band's hiatus and their upcoming tour. The song was released via Fleet Foxes' new YouTube channel, coupled with a lyric video created by Sean Pecknold and Adi Goodrich. The following day, Pecknold annotated some of the lyrics of the song using Genius, and appeared on BBC Radio 6 Music. An edited version of "Third of May / Ōdaigahara", with a duration of 4:02, was released three days later.

On March 18, 2017, Pecknold used Reddit to confirm a fan's theory that the first track on the new album would begin exactly where the last track on their previous album, Helplessness Blues, ended. Thus, the last notes of "Grown Ocean" will connect to the first notes of "I Am All That I Need / Arroyo Seco / Thumbprint Scar".

An album trailer made by Sean Pecknold was released on YouTube on April 4, 2017, featuring in-studio footage as well as previews of many forthcoming songs.

A first look at the packaging proofs of the vinyl was provided by Robin Pecknold on April 20, showcasing the front cover, the inside and the back cover. Many of the featured images are the work of Japanese photographer Hiroshi Hamaya.
When asked about the release of a second single from the album, Pecknold commented that it would be released in a "couple weeks" and that a music video was being made in the meantime.
He later announced that the "20 most frequent commenters" on his Instagram page were being rewarded with signed test pressings of the album as an expression of gratitude for their support.

A second track "Fool's Errand" was released on May 12, along with a music video created by Sean Pecknold and Adi Goodrich, and starring Jade-Lorna Sullivan.

The band performed four tracks from the album live on KEXP on May 17.

To support the album, Fleet Foxes began touring on May 15, 2017 with four "intimate" shows in the US, where they debuted new material from Crack-Up, followed by four shows at the Sydney Opera House Concert Hall, with the final Sydney show being streamed on Facebook Live. The band then continued their tour throughout 2017, with concerts in Europe, the United States and Canada.

The band announced on June 6, 2017 that Beats 1 would broadcast the exclusive, official premiere of "If You Need to, Keep Time on Me" the following day. The song was uploaded to their YouTube channel the same day.

The entire album was released via NPR on June 8, 2017, ahead of its official release.

Prior to the album's release, Fleet Foxes performed "Third of May / Ōdaigahara" for Live from the Artists Den at The Knockdown Center in Queens, New York, later releasing the performance on their YouTube page.

The band appeared on The Late Show with Stephen Colbert on June 16, the day of the album's release, to perform "Third of May". The following morning, June 17, they appeared on CBS This Morning's Saturday Sessions, playing "Third of May", "If You Need To, Keep Time on Me", and "Fool's Errand" live from Electric Lady Studios in New York.

Robin Pecknold appeared on the June 22 episode of Hrishikesh Hirway's podcast Song Exploder to break down the song "Mearcstapa", mentioning Ali Farka Touré, Can and Steve Strohmeier as influences. The band then appeared on the July 14 episode of Talia Schlanger's World Cafe to discuss the album and play some tracks live.

Fleet Foxes again appeared on The Late Show with Stephen Colbert on October 26 to perform "Fool's Errand".

Critical reception

Crack-Up received widespread acclaim from contemporary music critics. At Metacritic, which assigns a normalized rating out of 100 to reviews from mainstream critics, the album received an average score of 81, based on 31 reviews, which indicates "universal acclaim".

In his review for AllMusic, Timothy Monger wrote that the album was, "Orchestral, experimental, and more challenging than either of the band's previous releases, it's a natural fit for the Nonesuch label, whose heritage was built on such attributes. For Fleet Foxes, it represents a shift away from their more idyllic early days into a period of artistic growth and sophistication." Ian Cohen for Pitchfork gave similar praise by stating that, "Crack-Up supports the heft of Pecknold's concerns by working on a massive scale that no band is really attempting in 2017, let alone able to accomplish. Fleet Foxes are still a folk act, though one that's absorbed far-flung versions of the term."

Accolades

Commercial performance 
Crack-Up debuted at number nine on the US Billboard 200 with 34,000 album-equivalent units, of which 32,000 were pure album sales.

Track listing 

Sample credits
 "I Am All That I Need / Arroyo Seco / Thumbprint Scar" contains a recording of Fleet Foxes' "White Winter Hymnal" performed by Achievement First University Prep High School chorus "Phoenix Forte" under the direction of M. Anita Purcell.
 "On Another Ocean (January / June)" contains elements from "Tezeta" (traditional) performed by Mulatu Astatke.

Personnel 
Credits adapted from liner notes.

Fleet Foxes
 Robin Pecknold – vocals , classical guitar , dreadnought , electric guitar , 12 string acoustic , 12 string electric , Fender bass , piano , synthesizer , Baldwin electric harpsichord , prepared autoharp , marimba , Moog Minitaur , Hammond organ , mellotron , train loop , water loop , Korg drum machine , percussion , varispeed , footsteps , door , Memory Man Deluxe 
 Skyler Skjelset – vocals , electric guitar , Fender bass , piano , synthesizer , pencil on paper , cicada loop , glass harmonica , bowed cymbal , shamisen , percussion , programming , foley , Korg drum machine , amplifier noise , footsteps , Moog Minitaur , water harp 
 Christian Wargo – vocals , bass , drum kit 
 Casey Wescott – piano , chromatic bells , SuperCollider birdsong , qraqebs , kettledrum , programming , koto , harpsichord , Blue Noise synth 
 Morgan Henderson – cello , qraqebs , double bass , pitched bass clarinet , pitched flute , pitched clarinet , alto flute 

Additional musicians
 Hannah Epperson – violin 
 Matthew Barrick – drum kit and percussion 
 Christopher Icasiano – drum kit and percussion 
 Neal Morgan – drum kit , percussion 
 Brian McPherson – spoken word 
 String quartet 
 Russel Durham – first violin
 Jeremy Kittel – second violin
 Nicholas Cords – viola
 Dave Eggar – cello
 Jonathan Seale – production
 Gabriel Gall – arrangement
 The Westerlies – horns
 Andy Clausen – arrangement, trombone
 Willem de Koch – trombone
 Zubin Hensler – trumpet
 Riley Mulherkar – trumpet

Production
 Robin Pecknold – production
 Skyler Skjelset – production
 Phil Ek – mixing
 Greg Calbi – mastering
 Chris Allen – engineering 
 Grant Valentine – engineering 
 Owen Mulholland – engineering 
 Gabe Wax – engineering 
 Casey Wescott – engineering 
 Adam Burd – engineering 
 Gosha Usov – engineering 
 Beatriz Artola – engineering 

Design
 Ben Tousley – design and layout
 Robin Pecknold – design and layout
 Shawn Brackbill – band portrait
 Sean Pecknold – paintings
 Adi Goodrich – paintings
 Hiroshi Hamaya – front/back cover and interior photos

Charts

Weekly charts

Year-end charts

References

External links 
 Info page for Crack-Up at Nonesuch Records' website
 Official videos for Crack-Up

2017 albums
Fleet Foxes albums
Nonesuch Records albums
Albums recorded at Electric Lady Studios